Taylor Austin (born 18 January 1990) is a Canadian bobsledder who competes in the two-man and four-man events as a driver.

Career
Austin was recruited to compete in the sport of bobsleigh after finishing his football career at the University of Calgary.

During the 2019–20 season, Austin finished in first place in the overall rankings for the two-man and four-man events.

In January 2022, Austin was named to Canada's 2022 Olympic team in the two-man and four-man events.

References

External links
 
 
 
 

1990 births
Living people
Canadian male bobsledders
Sportspeople from Lethbridge
Bobsledders at the 2022 Winter Olympics
Olympic bobsledders of Canada
21st-century Canadian people